Chappuis is a French-language surname from the Arpitan region of eastern France and Francophone Switzerland with various spellings. Notable people with the surname include:

 Robert "Bob" Richard Chappuis (1923–2012), American football player
 Charyl Chappuis, Swiss-Thai footballer
 Eduardo Dibós Chappuis (called "Chachi"), Peruvian politician
 Eliane Cat-Tuong Chappuis (born 1978), model, actress, singer, producer of Swiss descent
 Friedrich-Wilhelm von Chappuis (1886–1942), General der Infanterie
 James Chappuis (1854–1934), French chemist
 Jason Lamy-Chappuis (born 1986, Missoula, Montana, USA), Franco-American ski jumper and cross-country skier
 Liliane Chappuis (1955–2007), Swiss politician
 Marie de Sales Chappuis, aka Marie-Thérèse Chappuis, Roman Catholic abbess
 Paul Emile Chappuis (1816–1887), French photographer, inventor, and manufacturer
 Philippe Chappuis (born 1967), Swiss comics creator
 Eustace Chapuys (c. 1490/92–21 January 1556), Savoyard diplomat

There is also a scientific term named after the French chemist James Chappuis.
 Chappuis absorption, absorption bands in the ozone layer

See also 
 Musée Chappuis-Fähndrich, Develier, Canton of Jura, Switzerland
 Chapuis

French-language surnames